Hydroxyethylethylenediaminetriacetic acid also known as HEDTA is a tricarboxylic acid and amine. It is a hexadentate ligand. It can chelate or form salts with many metals.

References

Tricarboxylic acids
Chelating agents